Minuscule 508 (in the Gregory-Aland numbering), ε 431 (in the Soden numbering), is a Greek minuscule manuscript of the New Testament, on parchment. Palaeographically it has been assigned to the 13th-century. 
Scrivener labelled it by number 494. It was adapted for liturgical use. The manuscript is lacunose.

Description 

The codex contains the text of the four Gospels on 168 parchment leaves (size ) with some lacunae (Matthew 1:1-23; 5:26-6:23; Luke 24:9-28; John 3:14-4:1; 15:9-16:6; 19:31-21:25). The text is written in one column per page, 24-27 lines per page.

There is also a division according to the smaller Ammonian Sections (in Mark 241 Sections, the last section in 16:9b), (no references to the Eusebian Canons).

It was written in wretched hand, the manuscript has survived in bad condition.

Text 

The Greek text of the codex is a representative of the Byzantine text-type with some alien readings. Aland did not place it in any Category.
According to the Claremont Profile Method it represents textual family Kx in Luke 20, mixed Byzantine text in Luke 10, and mixed text in Luke 1. It has some relationship to M groups.

History 

The manuscript came from Constantinople to England about 1731, and was presented to archbishop of Canterbury, William Wake, together with minuscules 73, 74, 506-520. Wake presented it to the Christ Church College in Oxford.

The manuscript was added to the list of New Testament minuscule manuscripts by F. H. A. Scrivener (494) and C. R. Gregory (508). Gregory saw it in 1883.

It is currently housed at the Christ Church (Wake 22) in Oxford.

See also 

 List of New Testament minuscules
 Biblical manuscript
 Textual criticism

References

Further reading

External links 

Greek New Testament minuscules
13th-century biblical manuscripts